Rufo is a given name. Notable people with the given name include:

Rufo Emiliano Verga (born 1969), Italian footballer
Rufo López-Fresquet (1911–1983), Cuban economist
Rufo Sánchez (born 1986), Spanish footballer

See also
Rufo (surname)
Ruffo